Cradle Will Rock is a 1999 American historical drama film written, produced and directed by Tim Robbins. The story fictionalizes the true events that surrounded the development of the 1937 musical The Cradle Will Rock by Marc Blitzstein; it adapts history to create an account of the original production, bringing in other stories of the time to produce a social commentary on the role of art and power in the 1930s, particularly amidst the struggles of the labor movement at the time and the corresponding appeal of socialism and communism among many intellectuals, artists and working-class people in the same period.

The film is not based on Orson Welles's unproduced screenplay for The Cradle Will Rock, an autobiographical drama about the production of Blitzstein's musical. Written in 1984, a year before Welles's death, the script was published in 1994; the film has not been produced.

Plot
At the height of the Great Depression, aspiring singer Olive Stanton dreams of getting a job as an actress with the Federal Theatre Project. Playwright Marc Blitzstein is working on his new musical, The Cradle Will Rock, but lacks the inspiration to finish it. While attending a public protest, he is visited by two imaginary figures representing his late wife and the famed German playwright Bertolt Brecht. They encourage him to make the play more relevant to the times rather than an abstract concept.

Ventriloquist Tommy Crickshaw is given the assignment to train the untalented duo Sid and Larry. He attempts to initiate a romance with FTP clerk Hazel Huffman. Actor Aldo Silvano moves out of the apartment paid for by his parents because of his family's fascist sympathies.

At the same time, the FTP faces increasing pressure from the federal government, which has begun investigating leftist infiltration of American society through the House Committee on Un-American Activities. Huffman and Crickshaw rehearse her alarmist testimony. The committee accuses FTP director Hallie Flanagan of propagating communism, making reference to her past claims and the play Revolt of the Beavers.

Huffman rejects Crickshaw's advances. He oversleeps and wakes up to Sid and Larry doing his routine, with one of them playing the dummy. Depressed, Crickshaw gives a show in which his dummy is a communist. Part of the disgusted audience, Huffman cries and leaves. Crickshaw leaves his dummy on the stage, which is carried off by Sid and Larry. After her testimony, Huffman is shunned by her coworkers.

The WPA, faced with the threat of losing its budget, cuts funding for all FTP productions, lays off thousands of workers, and orders all ongoing projects, including The Cradle Will Rock, to cease their activities. The actors' union refuses to let them perform without federal approval, cancelling the show's opening.

Rather than give in, the show's director, Orson Welles, and producer, John Houseman, set up an improvised performance in a shuttered theater, with Blitzstein as both the cast and the orchestra. As he begins the first song, the other actors suddenly appear in the audience and perform the entire play without setting foot on the stage. A group of workers destroy the mural Man at the Crossroads, following a dispute between Nelson Rockefeller and Diego Rivera over the inclusion of Russian communist leader Lenin in the artwork.

As the cast and audience break into celebration, a group of former FTP performers stage a mock funeral of Crickshaw's dummy (renamed "Federal Theatre Project") down the street outside. The  procession walks into present-day Times Square, which is lined with billboards advertising Broadway plays.

Cast

Historical context and production
This film takes place in the 1930s during the Great Depression. The film takes some narrative license and presents certain events as simultaneous, when they really occurred at different times. Some examples of this are the addition and subsequent destruction of Rivera's Man at the Crossroads in the RCA Building (1933–34), the Italian invasion of Ethiopia (1935), labor strikes against Little Steel (1937) and the Dies Committee’s assault on the Federal Theatre Project (1938) (Weales 2000).

In telling the story of The Cradle Will Rock—a leftist labor musical that was sponsored by the Federal Theatre Project (FTP) only to be banned after the WPA cut the project and diverted its funds elsewhere—Robbins is able to tie in issues such as labor unrest, repression by the House Committee on Un-American Activities, and the role and value of art in such a tumultuous time.

The film was released in conjunction with a book that Robbins put together to provide a deeper look into the film's time period. The book includes the film’s script, which is accompanied by essays and pictures describing the people, events, and themes that are the basis for the film.

The 1937 children's play Revolt of the Beavers by playwright/screenwriter Oscar Saul (who would later do the screenplay for the 1951 film A Streetcar Named Desire) was also featured in this film. It, too, was under scrutiny from the HUAC for promoting a communistic ideal of equal work and equal rewards. In the film it was valiantly defended by the head of the FTP, Hallie Flanagan (Cherry Jones), and the play ran for approximately one month at the Adelphi theater in New York.

Reception
Cradle Will Rock was met with mostly positive reviews. On review aggregator website Rotten Tomatoes, the film holds an approval rating of 65%, based on 74 reviews, and an average rating of 6.3/10. The site's consensus states: "Witty and provocative." On Metacritic, the film has a weighted average score of 64 out of 100, based on 31 critics, indicating "generally favorable reviews".

While the original production of The Cradle Will Rock was stated to be "The most exciting evening of theater this New York generation has seen" (MacLeish, Cole 2000), some critics did not feel the same about Robbins' reproduction of the event for film. Although it was nominated for the Palme d'Or at the 1999 Cannes Film Festival, among other festivals, and some have praised the film as an astute commentary on censorship and the lines between art and life (Cole 2000), others have criticized the piece for attempting to bring too many themes together into one story, and thus losing the power of the original context altogether (Alleva 2000; Weales 2000).

References

External links
 
 
 

1999 films
1990s political drama films
American political drama films
Films about writers
Films about theatre
Films directed by Tim Robbins
Films set in 1936
Films set in 1937
Films set in New York City
Films about Orson Welles
Rockefeller Center
Touchstone Pictures films
Federal Theatre Project
1999 drama films
Cultural depictions of Frida Kahlo
Films produced by Jon Kilik
1990s English-language films
1990s American films
English-language drama films